The 39th United States Congress was a meeting of the legislative branch of the United States federal government, consisting of the United States Senate and the United States House of Representatives. It met in Washington, D.C. from March 4, 1865, to March 4, 1867, during Abraham Lincoln's final month as president, and the first two years of the administration of his successor, Andrew Johnson.

The apportionment of seats in this House of Representatives was based on the 1860 United States census. Both chambers had a Republican majority.

Major events

 March 4, 1865: Second inauguration of President Abraham Lincoln.
 April 9, 1865: Surrender of Confederate forces at Appomattox Court House, effectively ending the American Civil War
 April 15, 1865: Assassination of President Abraham Lincoln, Vice President Andrew Johnson became President of the United States
 December 11, 1865: Creation of the House Appropriations Committee and the House Banking and Commerce Committee, reducing the tasks of the House Ways and Means Committee
 January, 1866: The second and current United States Capitol dome completed after 11 years of work.
 July 24, 1866: Tennessee became the first U.S. state to be readmitted to the Union following the American Civil War.
 November 5, 1866: United States House of Representatives elections, 1866
 January 8, 1867: African American men are granted the right to vote in the District of Columbia

Major legislation

 April 9, 1866: Civil Rights Act of 1866, Sess. 1, ch. 31, 
 July 16, 1866: Freedmen's Bureau Bill, Sess. 1, ch. 200, 
 July 23, 1866: Judicial Circuits Act, Sess. 1, ch. 210, reduced the number of United States circuit courts to nine and the number of Supreme Court justices to seven
 July 25, 1866: An Act to revive the grade of General in the United States Army, Sess. 1, ch. 232, (now called "4-star general"); Lieutenant General Ulysses S. Grant became the first to have this rank.
 July 28, 1866: Metric Act of 1866, Sess. 1, ch. 301, legalized the use of the metric system for weights and measures in the United States.
 March 2, 1867: Reconstruction Act, ch. 153,  established five military districts, each headed by a general, in ten states of the former Confederate South (Tennessee excepted), and stipulates conditions for re-admission of these States into the Union. 
 March 2, 1867: Tenure of Office Act, ch. 154,  required the president to obtain the Senate's advice and consent to suspend or dismiss certain federal public officials (notably cabinet officers).  Violation of this act will lead to the impeachment of Andrew Johnson by the next (40th) Congress in 1868.

Constitutional amendments 
 December 18, 1865: Thirteenth Amendment to the United States Constitution declared ratified
 June 13, 1866: Approved an amendment to the Constitution addressing citizenship rights and equal protection of the laws, and submitted it to the state legislatures for ratification
 Amendment was later ratified on July 9, 1868, becoming the Fourteenth Amendment to the United States Constitution

States admitted 

 July 24, 1866: Tennessee readmitted to representation.
 March 1, 1867: Nebraska admitted as the 37th state, Sess. 2, ch. 36,  (over president's veto)

Party summary
The count below identifies party affiliations at the beginning of the first session of this Congress, and includes members from vacancies and newly admitted states, when they were first seated. Changes resulting from subsequent replacements are shown below in the "Changes in membership" section.

Senate
During this Congress, two seats were added for the new state of Nebraska.

House of Representatives
During this Congress, one seat was added for the new state of Nebraska.

Leadership

Senate 
 President: Andrew Johnson (D), until April 15, 1865; vacant thereafter.
 President pro tempore: Lafayette S. Foster (R), until March 2, 1867
 Benjamin F. Wade (R), elected March 2, 1867
 Republican Conference Chairman: Henry B. Anthony

House of Representatives 
 Speaker: Schuyler Colfax (R)
 Republican Conference Chairman: Justin S. Morrill

Members

This list is arranged by chamber, then by state. Senators are listed in order of seniority, and representatives are listed by district.

Senate
Senators were elected by the state legislatures every two years, with one-third beginning new six-year terms with each Congress. Preceding the names in the list below are Senate class numbers, which indicate the cycle of their election. In this Congress, Class 1 meant their term began in the last Congress, requiring reelection in 1868; Class 2 meant their term began in this Congress, requiring reelection in 1870; and Class 3 meant their term ended in this Congress, requiring reelection in 1866.
Skip to House of Representatives, below

Alabama 
 2. Vacant
 3. Vacant

Arkansas 
 2. Vacant
 3. Vacant

California 
 1. John Conness (R)
 3. James A. McDougall (D)

Connecticut 
 1. James Dixon (R)
 3. Lafayette S. Foster (R)

Delaware 
 1. George Read Riddle (D)
 2. Willard Saulsbury Sr. (D)

Florida 
 1. Vacant
 3. Vacant

Georgia 
 2. Vacant
 3. Vacant

Illinois 
 2. Richard Yates (R)
 3. Lyman Trumbull (R)

Indiana 
 1. Thomas A. Hendricks (D)
 3. Henry S. Lane (R)

Iowa 
 2. James W. Grimes (R)
 3. James Harlan (R), until May 15, 1865
 Samuel J. Kirkwood (R), from January 13, 1866

Kansas 
 2. James H. Lane (R), until July 11, 1866
 Edmund G. Ross (R), from July 19, 1866
 3. Samuel C. Pomeroy (R)

Kentucky 
 2. James Guthrie (D)
 3. Garrett Davis (U)

Louisiana 
 2. Vacant
 3. Vacant

Maine 
 1. Lot M. Morrill (R)
 2. William Pitt Fessenden (R)

Maryland 
 1. Reverdy Johnson (D)
 3. John A. J. Creswell (UU), from March 9, 1865

Massachusetts 
 1. Charles Sumner (R)
 2. Henry Wilson (R)

Michigan 
 1. Zachariah Chandler (R)
 2. Jacob M. Howard (R)

Minnesota 
 1. Alexander Ramsey (R)
 2. Daniel S. Norton (R)

Mississippi 
 1. Vacant
 2. Vacant

Missouri 
 1. John B. Henderson (R)
 3. B. Gratz Brown (R)

Nebraska 
 1. Thomas Tipton (R), from March 1, 1867 (newly admitted state)
 2. John M. Thayer (R), from March 1, 1867 (newly admitted state)

Nevada 
 1. William M. Stewart (R)
 3. James W. Nye (R)

New Hampshire 
 2. Aaron H. Cragin (R)
 3. Daniel Clark (R), until July 27, 1866
 George G. Fogg (R), from August 31, 1866

New Jersey 
 1. William Wright (D), until November 1, 1866
 Frederick T. Frelinghuysen (R), from November 12, 1866
 2. John P. Stockton (D), March 15, 1865 – March 27, 1866
 Alexander G. Cattell (R), from September 19, 1866

New York 
 3. Ira Harris (R)
 1. Edwin D. Morgan (R)

North Carolina 
 2. Vacant
 3. Vacant

Ohio 
 1. Benjamin F. Wade (R)
 3. John Sherman (R)

Oregon 
 2. George H. Williams (R)
 3. James W. Nesmith (D)

Pennsylvania 
 1. Charles R. Buckalew (D)
 3. Edgar Cowan (R)

Rhode Island 
 1. William Sprague (R)
 2. Henry B. Anthony (R)

South Carolina 
 2. Vacant
 3. Vacant

Tennessee 
 1. David T. Patterson (U), from July 28, 1866
 2. Joseph S. Fowler (U), from July 24, 1866

Texas 
 1. Vacant
 2. Vacant

Vermont 
 1. Solomon Foot (R), until March 28, 1866
 George F. Edmunds (R), from April 3, 1866
 3. Jacob Collamer (R), until November 9, 1865
 Luke P. Poland (R), from November 21, 1865

Virginia 
 1. Vacant
 2. Vacant

West Virginia 
 1. Peter G. Van Winkle (UU)
 2. Waitman T. Willey (R)

Wisconsin 
 1. James R. Doolittle (R)
 3. Timothy O. Howe (R)

House of Representatives
The names of members of the House of Representatives are preceded by their district numbers.

Alabama 
 . Vacant
 . Vacant
 . Vacant
 . Vacant
 . Vacant
 . Vacant

Arkansas 
 . Vacant
 . Vacant
 . Vacant

California 
(3 Republicans)
 . Donald C. McRuer (R)
 . William Higby (R)
 . John Bidwell (R)

Connecticut 
(4 Republicans)
 . Henry C. Deming (R)
 . Samuel L. Warner (R)
 . Augustus Brandegee (R)
 . John H. Hubbard (R)

Delaware 
(1 Democrat)
 . John A. Nicholson (D)

Florida 
 . Vacant

Georgia 
 . Vacant
 . Vacant
 . Vacant
 . Vacant
 . Vacant
 . Vacant
 . Vacant

Illinois 
(11-3 Republican)
 . John Wentworth (R)
 . John F. Farnsworth (R)
 . Elihu B. Washburne (R)
 . Abner C. Harding (R)
 . Ebon C. Ingersoll (R)
 . Burton C. Cook (R)
 . Henry P. H. Bromwell (R)
 . Shelby M. Cullom (R)
 . Lewis W. Ross (D)
 . Anthony Thornton (D)
 . Samuel S. Marshall (D)
 . Jehu Baker (R)
 . Andrew J. Kuykendall (R)
 . Samuel W. Moulton (R)

Indiana 
(8-3 Republican)
 . William E. Niblack (D)
 . Michael C. Kerr (D)
 . Ralph Hill (R)
 . John H. Farquhar (R)
 . George W. Julian (R)
 . Ebenezer Dumont (R)
 . Daniel W. Voorhees (D), until February 23, 1866
 Henry D. Washburn (R), from February 23, 1866
 . Godlove S. Orth (R)
 . Schuyler Colfax (R)
 . Joseph H. Defrees (R)
 . Thomas N. Stilwell (R)

Iowa 
(6 Republicans)
 . James F. Wilson (R)
 . Hiram Price (R)
 . William B. Allison (R)
 . Josiah B. Grinnell (R)
 . John A. Kasson (R)
 . Asahel W. Hubbard (R)

Kansas 
(1 Republican)
 . Sidney Clarke (R)

Kentucky 
(5-4 Democratic)
 . Lawrence S. Trimble (D)
 . Burwell C. Ritter (D)
 . Henry Grider (D), until September 7, 1866
 Elijah Hise (D), from December 3, 1866
 . Aaron Harding (D)
 . Lovell H. Rousseau (UU), until July 21, 1866, and from December 3, 1866
 . Green C. Smith (UU), until July ??, 1866
 Andrew H. Ward (D), from December 3, 1866
 . George S. Shanklin (D)
 . William H. Randall (UU)
 . Samuel McKee (UU)

Louisiana 
 . Vacant
 . Vacant
 . Vacant
 . Vacant
 . Vacant

Maine 
(5 Republicans)
 . John Lynch (R)
 . Sidney Perham (R)
 . James G. Blaine (R)
 . John H. Rice (R)
 . Frederick A. Pike (R)

Maryland 
(3-2 Unconditional Unionist)
 . Hiram McCullough (D)
 . Edwin H. Webster (UU),  until July ??, 1865
 John L. Thomas Jr. (UU), from December 4, 1865
 . Charles E. Phelps (UU)
 . Francis Thomas (UU)
 . Benjamin G. Harris (D)

Massachusetts 
(10 Republicans)
 . Thomas D. Eliot (R)
 . Oakes Ames (R)
 . Alexander H. Rice (R)
 . Samuel Hooper (R)
 . John B. Alley (R)
 . Daniel W. Gooch (R), until September 1, 1865
 Nathaniel P. Banks (R), from December 4, 1865
 . George S. Boutwell (R)
 . John D. Baldwin (R)
 . William B. Washburn (R)
 . Henry L. Dawes (R)

Michigan 
(6 Republicans)
 . Fernando C. Beaman (R)
 . Charles Upson (R)
 . John W. Longyear (R)
 . Thomas W. Ferry (R)
 . Rowland E. Trowbridge (R)
 . John F. Driggs (R)

Minnesota 
(2 Republicans)
 . William Windom (R)
 . Ignatius L. Donnelly (R)

Mississippi 
 . Vacant
 . Vacant
 . Vacant
 . Vacant
 . Vacant

Missouri 
(8-1 Republican)
 . John Hogan (D)
 . Henry T. Blow (R)
 . Thomas E. Noell (R)
 . John R. Kelso (IR)
 . Joseph W. McClurg (R)
 . Robert T. Van Horn (R)
 . Benjamin F. Loan (R)
 . John F. Benjamin (R)
 . George W. Anderson (R)

Nebraska 
(1 Republican)
 . Turner M. Marquette (R), from March 2, 1867 (newly admitted state)

Nevada 
(1 Republican)
 . Delos R. Ashley (R)

New Hampshire 
(3 Republicans)
 . Gilman Marston (R)
 . Edward H. Rollins (R)
 . James W. Patterson (R)

New Jersey 
(3-2 Democratic)
 . John F. Starr (R)
 . William A. Newell (R)
 . Charles Sitgreaves (D)
 . Andrew J. Rogers (D)
 . Edwin R. V. Wright (D)

New York 
(20–11 Republican)
 . Stephen Taber (D)
 . Teunis G. Bergen (D)
 . James Humphrey (R), until June 16, 1866
 John W. Hunter (D), from December 4, 1866
 . Morgan Jones (D)
 . Nelson Taylor (D)
 . Henry J. Raymond (R)
 . John W. Chanler (D)
 . James Brooks (D), until April 7, 1866
 William E. Dodge (R), from April 7, 1866
 . William A. Darling (R)
 . William Radford (D)
 . Charles H. Winfield (D)
 . John H. Ketcham (R)
 . Edwin N. Hubbell (D)
 . Charles Goodyear (D)
 . John Augustus Griswold (R)
 . Orlando Kellogg (R), until August 24, 1865
 Robert S. Hale (R), from December 3, 1865
 . Calvin T. Hulburd (R)
 . James M. Marvin (R)
 . Demas Hubbard Jr. (R)
 . Addison H. Laflin (R)
 . Roscoe Conkling (R)
 . Sidney T. Holmes (R)
 . Thomas T. Davis (R)
 . Theodore M. Pomeroy (R)
 . Daniel Morris (R)
 . Giles W. Hotchkiss (R)
 . Hamilton Ward Sr. (R)
 . Roswell Hart (R)
 . Burt Van Horn (R)
 . James M. Humphrey (D)
 . Henry H. Van Aernam (R)

North Carolina 
 . Vacant
 . Vacant
 . Vacant
 . Vacant
 . Vacant
 . Vacant
 . Vacant

Ohio 
(17-2 Republican)
 . Benjamin Eggleston (R)
 . Rutherford B. Hayes (R)
 . Robert C. Schenck (R)
 . William Lawrence (R)
 . Francis C. Le Blond (D)
 . Reader W. Clarke (R)
 . Samuel Shellabarger (R)
 . James R. Hubbell (R)
 . Ralph P. Buckland (R)
 . James M. Ashley (R)
 . Hezekiah S. Bundy (R)
 . William E. Finck (D)
 . Columbus Delano (R)
 . Martin Welker (R)
 . Tobias A. Plants (R)
 . John Bingham (R)
 . Ephraim R. Eckley (R)
 . Rufus P. Spalding (R)
 . James A. Garfield (R)

Oregon 
(1 Republican)
 . James H. D. Henderson (R)

Pennsylvania 
(15-9 Republican)
 . Samuel J. Randall (D)
 . Charles O'Neill (R)
 . Leonard Myers (R)
 . William D. Kelley (R)
 . M. Russell Thayer (R)
 . Benjamin M. Boyer (D)
 . John M. Broomall (R)
 . Sydenham E. Ancona (D)
 . Thaddeus Stevens (R)
 . Myer Strouse (D)
 . Philip Johnson (D), until January 29, 1867
 . Charles Denison (D)
 . Ulysses Mercur (R)
 . George F. Miller (R)
 . Adam J. Glossbrenner (D)
 . Alexander H. Coffroth (D), February 19, 1866 – July 18, 1866
 William H. Koontz (R), from July 18, 1866
 . Abraham A. Barker (R)
 . Stephen F. Wilson (R)
 . Glenni W. Scofield (R)
 . Charles V. Culver (R)
 . John L. Dawson (D)
 . James K. Moorhead (R)
 . Thomas Williams (R)
 . George V. Lawrence (R)

Rhode Island 
(2 Republicans)
 . Thomas A. Jenckes (R)
 . Nathan F. Dixon Jr. (R)

South Carolina 
 . Vacant
 . Vacant
 . Vacant
 . Vacant

Tennessee 
(4 Unconditional Unionists; 4 Unionists)
 . Nathaniel G. Taylor (U), from July 24, 1866
 . Horace Maynard (UU), from July 24, 1866
 . William B. Stokes (UU), from July 24, 1866
 . Edmund Cooper (U), from July 24, 1866
 . William B. Campbell (U), from July 24, 1866
 . Samuel M. Arnell (UU), from July 24, 1866
 . Isaac R. Hawkins (U), from July 24, 1866
 . John W. Leftwich (UU), from July 24, 1866

Texas 
 . Vacant
 . Vacant
 . Vacant
 . Vacant

Vermont 
(3 Republicans)
 . Frederick E. Woodbridge (R)
 . Justin S. Morrill (R)
 . Portus Baxter (R)

Virginia 
 . Vacant
 . Vacant
 . Vacant
 . Vacant
 . Vacant
 . Vacant
 . Vacant
 . Vacant

West Virginia 
(3 Unconditional Unionists)
 . Chester D. Hubbard (UU)
 . George R. Latham (UU)
 . Kellian Whaley (UU)

Wisconsin 
(5-1 Republican)
 . Halbert E. Paine (R)
 . Ithamar C. Sloan (R)
 . Amasa Cobb (R)
 . Charles A. Eldredge (D)
 . Philetus Sawyer (R)
 . Walter D. McIndoe (R)

Non-voting members 
(6-3 Republican)
 . John N. Goodwin (R)
 . Allen A. Bradford (R)
 . Walter A. Burleigh (R)
 . Edward D. Holbrook (D)
 . Samuel McLean (D)
 . Phineas W. Hitchcock (R), until March 1, 1867
 . J. Francisco Chaves (R)
 . William H. Hooper (D)
 . Arthur A. Denny (R)

Changes in membership

The count below reflects changes from the beginning of the first session of this Congress.

Senate 
 Replacements: 8
 Democratic: 2-seat net loss
 Republican: 2-seat net gain
 Unionist: no net change
 Unconditional Union: no net change
 Deaths: 4
 Resignations: 2
 Vacancy: 1
 Seats of newly admitted states: 2
 Seats of re-admitted states: 2
Total seats with changes: 12

|-
| Maryland (3)
| Vacant
| Sen. Thomas Hicks had died during previous congress.Successor elected March 9, 1865.
| nowrap  | John Creswell (UU)
| March 9, 1865

|-
| New Jersey (2)
| Vacant
| Although elected in time for this Congress, the Senator-elect was not seated until March 15, 1865.Senator was later removed in election dispute, see below.
| nowrap  | John P. Stockton (D)
| March 15, 1865

|-
| Tennessee (2)
| rowspan=2 | Vacant
| rowspan=2  | Tennessee re-admitted to the Union.Senators were elected July 24, 1866.
| nowrap  | Joseph S. Fowler (U)
| July 24, 1866

|-
| Tennessee (1)
| nowrap  | David T. Patterson (U)
| July 28, 1866

|-
| Iowa (3)
| nowrap  | James Harlan (R)
| Resigned May 15, 1865, after being appointed U.S. Secretary of the Interior.Successor elected January 13, 1866.
| nowrap  | Samuel J. Kirkwood (R)
| January 13, 1866

|-
| Vermont (3)
| nowrap  | Jacob Collamer (R)
| Died November 9, 1865.Successor was appointed November 21, 1865, to continue the term.Appointee was elected October 24, 1866, to finish the term. 
| nowrap  | Luke P. Poland (R)
| November 21, 1865

|-
| New Jersey (2)
| nowrap  | John P. Stockton (D)
| Disputed election led to Senate vacating the seat March 27, 1866.Successor elected September 19, 1866.
| nowrap  | Alexander G. Cattell (R)
| September 19, 1866

|-
| Vermont (1)
| nowrap  | Solomon Foot (R)
| Died March 28, 1866.Successor was appointed April 3, 1866, to continue the term.Appointee was elected October 24, 1866, to finish the term.
| nowrap  | George F. Edmunds (R)
| April 3, 1866

|-
| Kansas (2)
| nowrap  | James H. Lane (R)
| Died July 11, 1866, after being mortally wounded from a self-inflicted gunshot 10 days earlierSuccessor was appointed July 19, 1866, to continue the term.Appointee was elected January 23, 1867, to finish the term.
| nowrap  | Edmund G. Ross (R)
| July 19, 1866

|-
| New Hampshire (3)
| nowrap  | Daniel Clark (R)
| Resigned July 27, 1866, after being appointed Judge of the U.S. District Court for the District of New Hampshire.Successor was appointed August 31, 1866.
| nowrap  | George G. Fogg (R)
| August 31, 1866

|-
| New Jersey (1)
| nowrap  | William Wright (D)
| Died November 1, 1866.Successor was appointed November 12, 1866.Appointee was elected January 23, 1867, to finish the term. 
| nowrap  | Frederick T. Frelinghuysen (R)
| November 12, 1866

|-
| Nebraska (1)
| rowspan=2 | New seat
| rowspan=2  | Nebraska admitted to the Union March 1, 1867.
| nowrap  | Thomas Tipton (R)
| rowspan=2 | March 1, 1867

|-
| Nebraska (2)
| nowrap  | John M. Thayer (R)
|}

House of Representatives 
 Replacements: 9
 Democratic: 1-seat net gain
 Republican: 2-seat net gain
 Unconditional Unionist: 1 seat net loss
 Unionist: 0 net change
 Deaths: 4
 Resignations: 4
 Contested election: 3
 Seats from newly admitted states: 1
 Seats from re-admitted states: 8
Total seats with changes: 21

|-
| 
| rowspan=8 | Vacant
| rowspan=8   | Tennessee re-admitted into the Union
| nowrap  | Nathaniel G. Taylor (U)
| rowspan=8 | July 24, 1866
|-
| 
| nowrap  | Horace Maynard (UU)
|-
| 
| nowrap  | William B. Stokes (UU)
|-
| 
| nowrap  | Edmund Cooper (U)
|-
| 
| nowrap  | William B. Campbell (U)
|-
| 
| nowrap  | Samuel M. Arnell (UU)
|-
| 
| nowrap  | Isaac R. Hawkins (U)
|-
| 
| nowrap  | John W. Leftwich (UU)
|-
| 
| nowrap  | Edwin H. Webster (UU)
| Resigned some time in July, 1865 after being appointed Collector of Customs for the port of Baltimore
| nowrap  | John L. Thomas Jr. (UU)
| December 4, 1865
|-
| 
| nowrap  | Orlando Kellogg (R)
| Died August 24, 1865
| nowrap  | Robert S. Hale (R)
| December 3, 1865
|-
| 
| nowrap  | Daniel W. Gooch (R)
| Resigned September 1, 1865, after being appointed Navy Agent for the port of Boston
| nowrap  | Nathaniel P. Banks (R)
| December 4, 1865
|-
| 
| Vacant
| incumbent Coffroth prevented from taking seat due to election contest 
| nowrap  | Alexander H. Coffroth (D)
| February 19, 1866
|-
| 
| nowrap  | Alexander H. Coffroth (D)
| Lost contested election July 18, 1866
| nowrap  | William H. Koontz (R)
| July 18, 1866
|-
| 
| nowrap  | Daniel W. Voorhees (D)
| Lost contested election February 23, 1866
| nowrap  | Henry D. Washburn (R)
| February 23, 1866
|-
| 
| nowrap  | James Brooks (D)
| Lost contested election April 7, 1866
| nowrap  | William E. Dodge (R)
| April 7, 1866
|-
| 
| nowrap  | James Humphrey (R)
| Died June 16, 1866
| nowrap  | John W. Hunter (D)
| December 4, 1866
|-
| 
| nowrap  | Green C. Smith (UU)
| Resigned some time in July, 1866 after being appointed Governor of the Montana Territory.
| nowrap  | Andrew H. Ward (D)
| December 3, 1866
|-
| 
| nowrap  | Lovell Rousseau (UU)
| Resigned July 21, 1866, after being reprimanded for his assault of Iowa Rep. Josiah B. Grinnell.  Was re-elected to fill his own seat.
| nowrap  | Lovell Rousseau (UU)
| December 3, 1866
|-
| 
| nowrap  | Henry Grider (D)
| Died September 7, 1866
| nowrap  | Elijah Hise (D)
| December 3, 1866
|-
| 
| nowrap  | Philip Johnson (D)
| Died January 29, 1867
| Vacant
| Not filled this term
|-
| 
| nowrap  | Phineas Hitchcock (R)
| Nebraska achieved statehood March 1, 1867
| colspan=2 | District eliminated
|-
| 
| New State
| Nebraska admitted to the Union March 1, 1867.  Seat remained vacant until March 2, 1867
| nowrap  | Turner M. Marquette (R)
| March 2, 1867
|}

Committees

Senate

 Agriculture (Chairman: John Sherman)
 Audit and Control the Contingent Expenses of the Senate (Chairman: George H. Williams)
 Claims (Chairman: Timothy O. Howe)
 Coins, Weights and Measures (Select)
 Commerce (Chairman: Zachariah Chandler)
 Compensation (Select)
 Distributing Public Revenue Among the States (Select)
 District of Columbia (Chairman: Lot M. Morrill)
 Engrossed Bills (Chairman: Aaron H. Cragin)
 Finance (Chairman: William P. Fessenden)
 Foreign Relations (Chairman: Charles Sumner)
 Indian Affairs (Chairman: John B. Henderson)
 Interior Department Clerical Force (Select)
 Judiciary (Chairman: Lyman Trumbull) 
 Manufactures (Chairman: William Sprague IV)
 Military Affairs and the Militia (Chairman: Henry Wilson)
 Mines and Mining (Chairman: John Conness)
 Mississippi River Levees Reconstruction (Select)
 National Banks (Select)
 National Telegraph Company (Select)
 Naval Affairs (Chairman: James W. Grimes)
 Ordnance and War Ships (Select)
 Pacific Railroad (Chairman: Jacob M. Howard)
 Patents and the Patent Office (Chairman: Waitman T. Willey)
 Pensions (Chairman: Henry S. Lane)
 Post Office and Post Roads (Chairman: Alexander Ramsey)
 Private Land Claims (Chairman: Ira Harris)
 Public Buildings and Grounds (Chairman: B. Gratz Brown)
 Public Lands (Chairman: Samuel C. Pomeroy)
 Retrenchment
 Revolutionary Claims (Chairman: Richard Yates)
 Tariff Regulation (Select)
 Territories (Chairman: Benjamin F. Wade)
 Whole

House of Representatives

 Accounts (Chairman: Edward H. Rollins)
 Agriculture (Chairman: John Bidwell)
 Appropriations (Chairman: Thaddeus Stevens)
 Banking and Currency (Chairman: Theodore M. Pomeroy) 
 Claims (Chairman: Columbus Delano)
 Coinage, Weights and Measures (Chairman: John A. Kasson)
 Commerce (Chairman: Elihu B. Washburne)
 District of Columbia (Chairman: Ebon C. Ingersoll)
 Elections (Chairman: Henry L. Dawes) 
 Expenditures in the Interior Department (Chairman: Ebenezer Dumont)
 Expenditures in the Navy Department (Chairman: George W. Julian)
 Expenditures in the Post Office Department (Chairman: Jehu Baker)
 Expenditures in the State Department (Chairman: Frederick A. Pike)
 Expenditures in the Treasury Department (Chairman: James M. Marvin)
 Expenditures in the War Department (Chairman: Henry C. Deming)
 Expenditures on Public Buildings (Chairman: John W. Longyear)
 Foreign Affairs (Chairman: Nathaniel P. Banks)
 Freedmen's Affairs (Chairman: Thomas D. Eliot)
 Indian Affairs (Chairman: William Windom)
 Invalid Pensions (Chairman: Sidney Perham)
 Judiciary (Chairman: James F. Wilson)
 Manufactures (Chairman: James K. Moorhead)
 Mileage (Chairman: George W. Anderson)
 Military Affairs (Chairman: Robert C. Schenck)
 Militia (Chairman: Abner C. Harding)
 Mines and Mining (Chairman: William Higby)
 Naval Affairs (Chairman: Alexander H. Rice)
 Pacific Railroads (Chairman: Hiram Price)
 Patents (Chairman: Thomas A. Jenckes)
 Post Office and Post Roads (Chairman: John B. Alley)
 Public Buildings and Grounds (Chairman: John H. Rice)
 Public Expenditures (Chairman: Calvin T. Hulburd)
 Public Lands (Chairman: George W. Julian)
 Revisal and Unfinished Business (Chairman: Glenni W. Scofield)
 Revolutionary Claims (Chairman: Kellian V. Whaley)
 Revolutionary Pensions (Chairman: Walter D. McIndoe)
 Roads and Canals (Chairman: Fernando C. Beaman)
 Rules (Select)
 Standards of Official Conduct
 Territories (Chairman: James M. Ashley)
 Ways and Means (Chairman: Justin S. Morrill)
 Whole

Joint committees

 Conditions of Indian Tribes (Special)
 Conduct of the War 
 Enrolled Bills (Chairman: Sen. James Nye)
 The Library (Chairman: N/A)
 Printing (Chairman: N/A)
 Retrenchment
 To Inquire into the Condition of the States which Formed the So-Called Confederate States

Caucuses 
 Democratic (House)
 Democratic (Senate)

Employees

Legislative branch agency directors 
 Architect of the Capitol: Thomas U. Walter, resigned May 26, 1865
 Edward Clark, appointed August 30, 1865
 Librarian of Congress: Ainsworth Rand Spofford

Senate 
 Chaplain: Thomas Bowman (Methodist), until March 9, 1865
 Edgar H. Gray (Baptist), from March 9, 1865
 Secretary: John W. Forney
 Sergeant at Arms: George T. Brown

House of Representatives 
 Chaplain: William Henry Channing (Unitarian), until December 4, 1865
 Charles B. Boynton (Congregationalist), from December 4, 1865
 Clerk: Edward McPherson
 Doorkeeper: Ira Goodnow
 Messenger to the Speaker: William D. Todd
 Postmaster: Josiah Given
 Reading Clerks: Edward W. Barber
 Sergeant at Arms: Nehemiah G. Ordway

See also 
 1864 United States elections (elections leading to this Congress)
 1864 United States presidential election
 1864–65 United States Senate elections
 1864–65 United States House of Representatives elections
 1866 United States elections (elections during this Congress, leading to the next Congress)
 1866–67 United States Senate elections
 1866–67 United States House of Representatives elections

Notes

References

Further reading
 Aynes, Richard L. "The 39th Congress (1865–1867) and the 14th Amendment: Some Preliminary Perspectives," Akron Law Review, 42 (no. 4, 2009), 1019–49.

External links
 Statutes at Large, 1789–1875
 Senate Journal, First Forty-three Sessions of Congress
 House Journal, First Forty-three Sessions of Congress
 Biographical Directory of the U.S. Congress
 U.S. House of Representatives: House History
 U.S. Senate: Statistics and Lists

Transcripts of debates and proceedings
The Congressional Globe contains the official transcripts and proceedings of the Thirty-Ninth Congress, although newspapers often provided their own transcripts that sometimes differed from the official ones.  Following are external links to the pertinent volumes of the Globe, which are downloadable and/or searchable via Google Books and HathiTrust:

The congressional debates pertaining to the Fourteenth Amendment can be found at “Congressional Debates of the Fourteenth Amendment to the United States Constitution”.